The Santiago Bernabéu Trophy is dedicated to the memory of long-time Real Madrid president Santiago Bernabéu. It is a friendly tournament organised each year by Real Madrid at the beginning of the season, somewhere around the end of August or the beginning of September.

From 1979 to 1982, in 1984 and in 1986 it was contested by four teams, with semi-finals, third place match and final. In 1983, 1985 and since 1987 only one match between Real Madrid and an invited team was played.

The 2002 tournament again consisted of four teams, on the special occasion of Real Madrid's centenary as the team was founded on 6 March 1902.

Finals
Note: In case of a draw, the winner was decided on penalties.

Titles by team

Top goalscorers

References

External links

Trofeo Bernabeu at Rec.Sport.Soccer Statistics Foundation.

Real Madrid CF
Spanish football friendly trophies
1979 establishments in Spain
Recurring sporting events established in 1979